Port Gardner, also known as Port Gardner Bay, is an inlet of Possession Sound on which the city of Everett, Washington is located. The Snohomish River flows into the north end of the bay.

It was named by George Vancouver for his patron and former commander, Alan Gardner. Vancouver meant the name to apply to all of Saratoga Passage, but over time it came to refer to only the bay near Everett.

References

External links
 

Everett, Washington
Landforms of Puget Sound
Bodies of water of Snohomish County, Washington
Inlets of Washington (state)